The Australia A Team Quadrangular Series in 2014 was a List A cricket tournament that was held in Darwin, Australia, between the teams Australia A, India A, South Africa A and Australia's National Performance Squad. India A won the tournament after beating Australia A in the final.

Squads

Ref:

Points table

Fixtures

Group stage

Round 1

Round 2

Finals

See also
South Africa A Team Triangular Series in 2013

References

External links
Tournament page on ESPNcricinfo

A team cricket
International cricket competitions in 2014
One Day International cricket competitions